Soul Eater may refer to:

 Soul eater (folklore), a folk belief of African and other traditional cultures
 Soul Eater (manga), a Japanese manga series by Atsushi Okubo, which has been adapted into an anime television series
 Soul Eater Evans, the titular character of the Soul Eater manga and anime
 Soul Eater Not!, a manga spin-off series to Soul Eater
 Soul Eater (novel), a fantasy novel by Michelle Paver
 Soul Eater, a science-fiction novel by K. W. Jeter
 Soul Eater, one of the main weapons of Riku, a protagonist in the role-playing game Kingdom Hearts
 "Soul Eater", a song by The Clouds from the 1991 album Penny Century
 Souleater, 1989 EP by Surgery
 The Eater of Souls, one of two central characters in The Laundry Files, a series of novels by Charles Stross